Traffic noise may include:

 Roadway noise
 Railway noise
 Aircraft noise

See also 
 Ambience (sound recording)
 Environmental noise
 Noise pollution

Noise pollution